Beni is an Australian musician, DJ, producer, and remix engineer. He is a part of the Riot In Belgium duo with Joel Dickson. Beni has released music through the French Kitsuné and the Australian Modular Recordings.

Career

Solo career

My Love Sees You
Beni released his first single "My Love Sees You" on 19 January 2008, through Kitsuné. The song features extra production work by Sam Littlemore, marking the first of two collaborations between the two. The song stayed on both the Flemish and Walloon Ultratop Dance Chart in Belgium for five weeks, peaking at the chart position of nine. The track was later featured on Kitsuné Maison Compilation 6. An official remix from the maxi single was produced by Etienne de Crécy, named, "My Love Sees You" (Coco Walsh Etienne de Crécy Mix), it is the first of two times the musicians will work together.

Maximus
The following year, 2009, a shortened version of the track "Fringe Element" was featured on Kitsuné Maison Compilation 7 named "Fringe Element" (Short Like Me Edit). On 4 August 2009 Beni released his extended play Maximus featuring the new, full length, version of "Fringe Element", and the title track "Maximus" as well as an alternate mix named "Maximus" (White). The Title track was released as Beni's second single, featuring vocals by Sam Sparro, marking the first of four collaborations between the two. The remix EP for "Maximus" was released on 24 August 2009. In Belgium the single peaked at 16 on the Ultratop Dance Chart, remaining on the chart for two weeks. Additionally, the Harvard Bass Remix of "Maximus" was featured on the Kitsuné Maison Compilation 8.

House of Beni
House of Beni was released on 23 September 2011, with Modular Recordings. In Australia, Beni's home country, on 21 November 2011, the album entered the iTunes albums chart at No. 47, inevitably peaking at No. 24 on 27 November 2011, staying on the chart for 15 days. The album failed to chat on the ARIA Top 50 Digital Albums Chart or any Hung Medien charts. However, corresponding with the album's chart movement on iTunes, "Someone Just Like You" (featuring Mattie Safer), the album's second single, released as of 21 October 2011, entered the ARIA Top 50 Club Tracks Chart at No. 44 the week commencing 10 October 2011. The song went on to peak at No. 30, on 14 November 2011, after 6 weeks on the chart. The song stayed on the chart for an additional four weeks, a total of 10 weeks, dropping of the chart on 19 December 2011, the week before charting No. 44.

House of Beni's lead single, "It's a Bubble", was released on 31 July 2011, with vocals by Sean DeLear, and production by Turbotito of Poolside. On 22 April 2012 the last single from the album, "Last Night", was released. It features vocals by Prince Terrence and extra production by Etienne de Crécy, the second time that de Crécy & Beni have worked together. The first track off the album, "Sway", features vocals from singer-songwriter Nomi Ruiz. The album also features Sam Sparro on the tracks "Your Body" and "High Off Your Love" as vocalist and lyric writer, being the pairs second and third collaborations. The song "Love Scene" was produced in joint with Sam Littlemore, this being the second time they worked together. The final track from House of Beni is "Zig Zags", featuring vocals by Via Tania. The album also includes the songs "O.P.U.L.E.N.C.E" and "Yeah".

Remixes by Beni
Beni has engineered remixes for Flight Facilities, Kimbra, LaRoux, Sam Sparro, Sneaky Sound System, and The Temper Trap. Most notable is his remix for LaRoux. Beni engineered "Quicksand" (Beni's Sinking at 1.56 Mix) in 2008, which appeared on half of the song's physical and digital single releases, including 12" and CD releases. Also notable is Beni's remix for Sam Sparro, "Happiness"
(Beni Remix), as it marks their fourth time having worked together.

Riot in Belgium
Riot in Belgium is a duo of Beni and Joel Dickson. They've made several remixes of artist such as Chromeo and Yelle. 
Their remix of Yelle's song À cause des garçons was featured as soundtrack to the videogame Need for Speed: ProStreet in late 2007.

Discography

Studio albums

Extended plays and singles

Notes
 Track does not feature Sparro.
 Mix does not feature Prince Terrence.

Charted songs

Remixes

Appears on
 Kitsuné Maison Compilation 6 (2008 Kitsuné France)
 Kitsuné Maison Compilation 7 (2009 Kitsuné France)
 Kitsuné Maison Compilation 8 (2009 Kitsuné France)

References

External links
Beni on Myspace

Kitsuné artists
Living people
Year of birth missing (living people)